Bulldog Tools is a British manufacturer of gardening and agricultural tools based in Wigan, Greater Manchester, England. The company was founded by William & Henry Parkes, and established in 1780 at the Clarington Forge site in Ince in Makerfield, near Wigan, then in Lancashire. Bulldog Tools is one of the oldest businesses still existing in the Wigan area today, still producing products on the same factory site as originally intended. Bulldog spades were deployed by the British during WW1 to dig trenches and are still issued in the British military today. Today it is owned by the Rollins Group based in Harlow in Essex who acquired Bulldog Tools in 2004.

Garden tools 
Tools produced at the factory include spades, shovels, forks, rakes, hoes and various gardening hand tools. These products are made for agricultural and domestic use. The spade and fork heads are solid forged using a single piece of steel and were up until recently made using carbon steel, today a boron steel compound is preferred. The company is one of the last remaining manufacturers of traditional solid forged garden tools in the UK.

The world's largest spade
In 2010, as part of its 230th anniversary celebrations, Bulldog Tools manufactured the world's largest spade at its forge in Wigan. The spade is 3.61 metres high, weighs 180 kg and took 160 hours to make. It held the Guinness World Record until 17 July 2014.

References

External links
 Bulldog Tools website
 Bulldog Tools USA website

Garden tool manufacturers
Companies based in Wigan
Manufacturing companies of the United Kingdom